Bacidia areolata is a rare species of corticolous (bark-dwelling) lichen in the family Ramalinaceae. Found in the Russian Far East, it was formally described as a new species in 2018 by Julia Gerasimova and Andreas Beck. The type specimen was collected by the first author from the Bolshekhekhtsirskiy State Natural Reserve (Khabarovsky District), where it was found growing on the bark of Acer tegmentosum in a coniferous-broadleaf forest near a river. The lichen is only known to occur at the type locality.

Description

Bacidia areolata is similar to Bacidia suffusa, but unlike that species, has an areolate thallus and lighter-coloured apothecia. These apothecia, which typically measure 0.4–0.6 mm in diameter, are more or less flat when young and either remain so in maturity or become somewhat convex. They have a pale pink to peach-coloured  that sometimes becomes mottled in maturity, and a pale pink to yellow-brown margin. Ascospores are straight to slightly curved, and measure 47–67 μm long by 3–4 μm wide, with anywhere from 6 to 15 septa.

References

Ramalinaceae
Lichen species
Lichens described in 2018
Lichens of the Russian Far East